Kravasaras or Kravassaras is the former, Ottoman-era name of the following Greek settlements:
 Amfilochia
 Vasilika, Boeotia